Vidyapati Nagar is a village in the Samastipur district, in Bihar, India. Named after great maithili poet Vidyapati (c. 1380 – 1460), also known by the sobriquet Maithil Kavi Kokil (the poet cuckoo of Maithili), was a Maithili and Sanskrit poet-saint, composer, writer, courtier and royal priest.[2] He was a devotee of Shiva, but also wrote love songs and devotional Vaishnava songs.[3] He knew Sanskrit, Prakrit, Apabhramsha, and Maithili.[3] . It belongs to the Darbhanga division of the district.

Location 

Vidyapati Nagar is located 35 km south of the district headquarters of Samastipur and 82 km west of the state capital, Patna. Bachhwara and  Mansurchak to the east of Vidyapati Nagar, with Dalsinghsarai lies to the north, and Mohiuddinagar to the west. The closest cities are: Dalsinghsarai, Barh, Mokameh and Mokama.

Demographics

The local languages are Maithili, Urdu and Hindi. According to the 2011 census, the population was 122,244, with 51.8% male. The city contains 29 villages organized into 15 panchayats, for a total of 20,708 houses.

References 

 Cities and towns in Samastipur district